Blind Man's Luck is a 1917 American silent drama film directed by George Fitzmaurice and starring Helene Chadwick, Mollie King, and Earle Foxe.

Cast
 Helene Chadwick as Helen 
 Mollie King as Eileen Caverly 
 Earle Foxe as Boby Guerton 
 Riley Hatch as Mr. Hatch 
 Zeffie Tilbury as Mrs. Guerton 
 Francis Byrne as Cromwel Crow

References

Bibliography
 Donald W. McCaffrey & Christopher P. Jacobs. Guide to the Silent Years of American Cinema. Greenwood Publishing, 1999.

External links
 

1917 films
1917 drama films
1910s English-language films
American silent feature films
Silent American drama films
American black-and-white films
Films directed by George Fitzmaurice
Pathé Exchange films
1910s American films